Maurizio De Jorio (born September 24, 1968) is an Italian singer, active since 1991. Maurizio De Jorio was born in Trento, Italy. De Jorio became involved in mainstream musical production in the mid-1980s.

Like most musicians in the Eurobeat genre, De Jorio has performed under a number of pseudonyms for various labels (including Polydor Records, Delta, and SinclaireStyle). He is most well known for his songs "Running in the 90s" and "Night of Fire". Both are featured in the anime Initial D – of which both appearances (among other songs featured in the anime) has garnered incredible popularity for De Jorio and the eurobeat genre in general. Some of the other songs used in Initial D are: "Speedy Speed Boy", "Stop Your Self Control" (as 'Marko Polo'), "Running in the 90s" (as 'Max Coveri'), "Take Me to the Top", (as 'D. Essex'), "Golden Age" (as Max Coveri), and "No One Sleep in Tokyo" (as 'Edo Boys').

De Jorio's musical origins are unknown, but in 1991, Gino Caria had taken him to Polydor Records and signed him to the record, beginning his Eurobeat career. His first song that he lended his vocals to was "Love & Celebration" by David Essex. in 1992, he had started working with Andrea Leonardi (Bratt Sinclaire), who was currently freelancing for the label. He split from Polydor Records later in the mid 1990s to join Sinclaire and his newly co-founded Eurobeat label, Delta Music Industry, which was also co-founded by Laurent Schruster Gelmetti (Laurent Newfield) and Clara Moroni, who had both worked at Time Records. De Jorio had worked with Newfield and Moroni for a good number of songs, which in 2019, were released on the Delta Ultimate Collection and Bratt Sinclaire Eurobeat Style album compilations. Currently, De Jorio performs under the aliases Niko and Dejo for Bratt Sinclaire's label SinclaireStyle.

De Jorio had performed under the alias Max Coveri, which had previously been used by Mauro Farina, then by Massimo Brancaccio before he adopted the drag queen alias Billy More.

Partial discography

As lead artist
As 7th Heaven

1990s

2000s

As Alan Ford

As Casanova
 Lost In The Time (Extended Version) (released 21 Nov 1992) (Super Eurobeat Vol. 29 - Extended Version)
 Lost In The Time (Acappella) (released 1992) (Lost In The Time)
 Lost In The Time (Extended Mix) (released 1992) (Lost In The Time)
 Lost In The Time (Instrumental) (released 1992) (Lost In The Time)
 Lost In The Time (Radio Mix) (released 1992) (Lost In The Time)
 Power of Love (released 21 March 1993) (Super Eurobeat Vol. 31 - Extended Version)
 Lost In The Time (released 21 May 1993) (Super Eurobeat Vol. 33 - Non-Stop Mix- King & Queen Special)
 Don't Leave Me Now (released 21 Aug 1993) (Super Eurobeat Vol. 36 - Non Stop Mega Mix- King & Queen Special) (Super Eurobeat Presents Men’s 濡れユーロ~ノン・ストップ男性哀愁ユーロ・スペシャル~)
 Don't Leave Me Now (Bonus Track) (released 1993) (Don't Leave Me Now)
 Don't Leave Me Now (Dance Mix) (released 1993) (Don't Leave Me Now)
 Don't Leave Me Now (Playback) (released 1993) (Don't Leave Me Now)
 Don't Leave Me Now (Radio Edit) (released 1993) (Don't Leave Me Now)
 Feel The Passion (released 24 Dec 1993) (Super Eurobeat Vol. 40 - Anniversary Nonstop Edition) (Super Eurobeat Presents Men’s 濡れユーロ~ノン・ストップ男性哀愁ユーロ・スペシャル~)
 Feel The Passion (Bonus Track) (released 1993) (Feel The Passion)
 Feel The Passion (Extended Mix) (released 1993) (Feel The Passion) (Super Eurobeat Vol. 38 - Extended Version)
 Feel The Passion (Instrumental) (released 1993) (Feel The Passion)
 Feel The Passion (Radio Mix) (released 1993) (Feel The Passion)
 In The Name Of Love (Y & Co Mix) (released 1993) (In The Name Of Love (Remix) / What Is Love (Remix)) (Super Eurobeat Vol. 95)
 In The Name Of Love (released 21 July 1994) (Super Eurobeat Vol. 47 - Non-Stop Mega Mix) (Maharaja Night Vol. 12 - Non-Stop Disco Mix) (Super Eurobeat Vol. 50 - Anniversary Non-Stop Mix - Greatest Euro Hits 50!) (The Best Of Non-Stop Super Eurobeat 1994) (~The Early Days Of SEB~ Euro Darkness 3) (Super Eurobeat Presents Vol. 200 Release Special Collection Vol. 1) (The Best Of 90s Super Eurobeat 70 Mins 70 Songs)
 In The Name Of Love (Bonus Track) (released 1994) (Suspicious / In The Name Of Love)
 In The Name Of Love (Extended Version) (released 1994) (Suspicious / In The Name Of Love)
 In The Name Of Love (Extended Mix) (released 21 Apr 1994) (Super Eurobeat Vol. 44 - Extended Version)
 In The Name Of Love (Instrumental) (released 1994) (Suspicious / In The Name Of Love)
 In The Name Of Love (Radio Version) (released 1994) (Suspicious / In The Name Of Love)
 Under Pressure (Extended Mix) (released 21 July 1994) (Maharaja Night - Hi-NRG Revolution Vol. 11)
 Under Presser (Extended Mix) (released 1994) (I Love Disco Dance / Under Presser)
 Under Presser (Special Radio Mix) (released 1994) (I Love Disco Dance / Under Presser)
 Suspicious (Bonus Track) (released 1994) (Suspicious / In The Name Of Love)
 Suspicious (Extended Mix) (released 1994) (Suspicious / In The Name Of Love)
 Suspicious (FM Version) (released 1994) (Suspicious / In The Name Of Love)
 Suspicious (Playback) (released 1994) (Suspicious / In The Name Of Love)
 I Did It For Love (Extended Mix) (released 21 Aug 1995) (Super Eurobeat Vol. 59 - Extended Version)
 Help Me To Say Goodbye (released 22 May 1996) (Super Eurobeat Vol. 67) (Super Eurobeat Vol. 230 - Anniversary Hits 100 Tracks)
 Help Me To Say Goodbye (Acappella Version) (released 1996) (Help Me To Say Goodbye)
 Help Me To Say Goodbye (Extended Mix) (released 1996) (Help Me To Say Goodbye)
 Help Me To Say Goodbye (F.M. Version) (released 1996) (Help Me To Say Goodbye)
 Help Me To Say Goodbye (Playback Version) (released 1996) (Help Me To Say Goodbye)
 I Would Die for You (released 25 September 1996) (Super Eurobeat Vol. 71)
 Jealous Guy (released 23 Apr 1997) (Super Eurobeat Vol. 77)
 Just for Tonight (released 24 Jun 1998) (Super Eurobeat Vol. 89) (Eurobeat Masters Vol. 2) (Super Eurobeat Presents Men’s 濡れユーロ~ノン・ストップ男性哀愁ユーロ・スペシャル~)
 Same Old Feeling (released 19 September 2002) (Super Eurobeat Vol. 131)
 Coming Home (released 2002) (The Sound Of Frozen Pop Hits)
 Superfly (released 22 January 2003) (Super Eurobeat Vol. 134) (The Best Of Non-Stop Super Eurobeat 2003)
 Satisfy My Soul (released 27 April 2005) (Super Eurobeat Presents Super GT 2005)
 The Hero (released 2005) (Super Eurobeat Vol. 157)
 Holiday (Instrumental Mix) (released 3 May 2014) (Beach Club Records Instrumental Versions - Volume 1)
 Crazy Love (released 25 January 2019, unreleased track from 2001) (Crazy Love)
 Crazy Love (Platinum Version) (released 18 June 2014) (Super Eurobeat Vol. 229 - Extended Version)

As Dejo
 1.2.3.4. Fire! (Extended Mix) (released 1 September 2010) (Super Eurobeat Vol. 207)
 Boys Gone Wild (released 23 January 2013) (Boys Gone Wild)
 Drifting all night (released 28 October 2020) (Best of Super Eurobeat 2020)
 For The Fans with Tora (released 18 June 2014) (For The Fans)
 In The Eyes Of A Tiger with Bratt (released 18 February 2015) (In The Eyes Of A Tiger)
Lightning Over Japan 
 Loving Eurobeat with Bon (released 12 February 2013) (Loving Eurobeat)
 Too Young to Fall in Love (released 7 January 2009) (Super Eurobeat Vol. 193 - Revival Hits)
 We Rock'em All with Chai (released 22 June 2016) (Super Eurobeat Vol. 239 - Extended Version)
 Wheelpower And Go! with Bon (released 2 February 2010) (Super Eurobeat Vol. 211)
 Wilder Faster Louder (released 15 January 2014) (Wilder Faster Louder)

As Delta All-Stars (with Clara Moroni, Davide Gelosa, and Daniela Rando)
 Christmas Time
 Trust Me
As D-Essex

 All Your Love (Dance Mix)
 Burning Love
 Demolition Man
 Listen to the Rhythm
 Tokyo Tokyo
Victim of Love

As D. Essex
 Boom Boom Fire
Boom Boom Fire (Hyper Techno Version)
 Breaking The Law
 Dancing Crazy
 Fahrenheit Euronight
 Hyper Star Energy
 Master Power
 Max Power with Dr. Love
 Music for Hire
 Music Forever
 Restless and Wild
 Take Me to the Top
 Thank You-Arigato

As David Essex
 Goodbye Illusion
 Love & Celebration
 Sin of Love

As Edo Boys (With Fernando Bonini)
 No One Sleep in Tokyo
 My Rock Is For Japan
Leaving Planet Earth

As Kevin Johnson
Big Is Your Faith
Welcome to my World
Yankee

As Marko Polo
 Baby Queen Seventeen
 Cyberdance Technotrance
 Hai Hai Hai (Dance Across the Nations)
 I Want to Believe
 Mad Guy
 Money Go!
 Peace and Love for Christmas
 Saturday Night
 Speedy Speed Boy
 Stop Your Self Control (released 18 June 2003)
 Tokyo Fever

As Max Coveri
 Golden Age
 High Desire
I Don't Wanna Break Your Sweet Heart
 Like a Thunder
 Running in the 90s
 Supercar

As Morris
 Bad Tonight
 Crazy for Your Love
 Destination Unknown

As Morris & Cherry
 Go! Save Goal!
 Still Love You All
Go Say Goal

As Niko
 1 for the Money, 2 for the Show
 Electric Power
 It's My Life
 Let's Go Wild!
 Livin' On A Prayer
 Made of Fire
 Night of Fire
 Night of Fire (For Christmas Mix)
 Night of Fire (Hyper Techno Mix)
 Onto the Beat of my Bang Bang!
 Pilot Is the Hero
 Speedway
 Superbad
 Super Eurobeat
 Tora Tora Tora 2005 (with Cherry and The Prophet)
 We Came for the Rock

As Niko & Cherry (With Clara Moroni)
 Niko Kickboxing

As Niko & Domino
 Super Mega Stars

As Oda
 Face to Face
 Sex Crime
 Shy Gun
 Speed Demon (King of Kings)

As Roswell
 Alien Light
 Come On!
My Way

As Charlie Tango

 Tattoo

As SEB All Stars (With Giancarlo Pasquini, Alessandra Gatti, Christian Codenatti, Luigi Raimondi, Ennio Zanini, Davide Di Marcantonio, Mauro Farina, Federico Pasquini, Evelin Malferrari, and Federico Rimonti)

 SEB 4 U

As SinclaireStyle All Stars (With Roberta Grana and Manuela Leschino)

 Xmas Love

As Tokyo Future (With Fernando Bonini)

 Da Burning Tokyo
Listen to Eurobeat
Tokyo Future (Signed as Tokyo Future ft. Marko Polo and Mako)
We Go Boom! You Go Boom!

Inclusion in other media 
 Many of his songs are used for fad music on the website, YTMND.
 His promotional model, Edoardo Arlenghi, is used in place of his own image for the marketing of songs under his pseudonym "Niko".  He can be seen most prominently in the music video for the song "Night of Fire".
 De Jorio's #1 worldwide hit Night Of Fire was originally sung by Edoardo Arlenghi but was changed at the last moment.
 Various songs including "Night of Fire", "Speedy Speed Boy", "Golden Age" , and "Running in the 90s" are featured in the Japanese anime Initial D, which contributed to the popularity of eurobeat music. Additionally, "Running in the 90s" became an Internet meme due to its inclusion in Initial D, being played in many videos where vehicles are seen driving at high speeds.

References

External links 
 Maurizio De Jorio's SinclaireStyle Profile
 SinclaireStyle
 E-P D.Essex Information Page
 Max Coveri's full discography (includes both Farina's and De Jorio's work)
 Credits for "Golden Age" (confirms De Jorio's performance)
 Credits for "Running in the '90s" and "Speedy Speed Boy" (confirms De Jorio's performance)

1968 births
Living people
Eurobeat musicians
Italian male singers
Italian Italo disco musicians
Polydor Records artists
Initial D